It! (alternate titles: Anger of the Golem and Curse of the Golem) is a 1967 British horror film made by Seven Arts Productions and Gold Star Productions, Ltd. that features the Golem of Prague as its main subject. Herbert J. Leder is the film's producer, screenwriter, and director. The film was made in the style of the Hammer Studios films both in sound and cinematography. It! stars Roddy McDowall as the mad assistant museum curator Arthur Pimm, who brings the Golem to life.

Plot

A London museum's warehouse burns down, leaving undamaged a statue that the museum curator, Mr. Grove, identifies as "Mid-European Primitive." Grove is mysteriously killed while inspecting the artifact when his assistant, Arthur Pimm, is sent to fetch a flashlight for him. This begins a series of unexplained deaths and calamities connected with the statue, which is later positively identified as the Golem of Judah Loew of the 16th century. An inscription in Hebrew heightens the suspense and horror of the plot:

Arthur Pimm, a Norman Bates-like character, who keeps his mother's corpse in his apartment and borrows museum jewelry exhibits to adorn it, brings the Golem to life by placing a small scroll containing the Hebrew word "emeth" ("truth") into its mouth, which he finds in a compartment located at the top of the Golem's right foot. The Golem then becomes Pimm's accomplice in murder and mayhem, contrary to its original purpose to defend its community. When the Golem is suspected of bringing about the catastrophic destruction of Hammersmith Bridge, Pimm tries to destroy it. This is impossible, as the inscription predicts: "for neither by fire, nor water, nor force, nor anything by man created" can it be destroyed. This is borne out in the final scenes of the film by the detonation of a small nuclear warhead in an attempt to stop it.

Caught up in all of this is Ellen Grove, the daughter of the first deceased curator with whom Pimm is in love, but she falls in love with Jim Perkins of the New York Museum, who identifies the Golem and seeks to acquire it for his museum. Perkins exposes Pimm to the police, and Pimm is committed to an insane asylum. He breaks out of the asylum and kidnaps Ellen with the help of the Golem. Pimm holes up in the museum's annex in the country known as "the Cloisters." Perkins dramatically saves Ellen from the aforementioned nuclear explosion that vaporizes both Pimm and "the Cloisters," but not the Golem which, for unknown reasons, retreats into the sea.

Cast
 Roddy McDowall as Arthur Pimm
 Jill Haworth as Ellen Grove
 Paul Maxwell as Jim Perkins
 Aubrey Richards as Professor Weal
 Ernest Clark as Harold Grove
 Oliver Johnston as Curator Trimingham
 Noel Trevarthen as Inspector White
 Ian McCulloch as Detective Wayne
 Richard Goolden as the old rabbi
 Dorothy Frere as Miss Swanson
 Tom Chatto as the young captain
 Steve Kirby as Ellis the electrician
 Russell Napier as boss
 Frank Sieman as museum workman
 Brian Haines as first museum guard
 John Baker as second museum guard
 Mark Burns as first officer
 Raymond Adamson as second officer
 Lindsay Campbell as policeman
 Alan Seller as the Golem of Prague

Release

Theatrical release
Since Seven Arts Productions acquired Warner Bros. in 1967, the film was released by Warner Bros.-Seven Arts in the United States. The film was widely released in the U.S. in 1967 as a double feature with The Frozen Dead.

Home media
It! was released on DVD on 9 December 2008 when Warner Home Video released it with The Shuttered Room in on Warner Home Video Horror Double Feature.

Reception
Jason P. Vargo from IGN awarded the film a score of 4/10, calling it "a sub-par creature feature". Author and film critic Leonard Maltin gave the film a mixed two out of four stars.
David Camak Pratt from PopMatters, reviewing the double feature DVD release, awarded it three out of 10 stars. In his review, Pratt called the film "uneven" and "ridiculous", while also criticizing the film's Psycho-like plot points as being both obvious and pointless.

References

External links
 
 
 

1967 films
1967 horror films
British horror films
Films directed by Herbert J. Leder
Golem films
1960s monster movies
Warner Bros. films
1960s English-language films
British monster movies
1960s British films